Q'illu Qisqa (Quechua q'illu yellow, qisqa, qhisqa flint, "yellow flint", also spelled Khellu Khisca) is a mountain in the Bolivian Andes which reaches a height of approximately . It is located in the Chuquisaca Department, Jaime Zudáñez Province, Icla Municipality. Q'illu Qisqa lies at the Icla River which is a left tributary of the Pillku Mayu ("red river").

References 

Mountains of Chuquisaca Department